The Boeing Classic is a professional golf tournament in Washington on the PGA Tour Champions, founded  in 2005.  The 54-hole event is played annually in late August in Snoqualmie, east of Seattle. It was titled the "Boeing Greater Seattle Classic" for its first two years and Boeing is the main sponsor.

History
The Seattle area's previous senior tour event, the GTE Northwest Classic, ran from 1986 through 1995. The first edition was at Sahalee Country Club and the remainder were at Inglewood Golf Club in Kenmore.

Since its inception in 2005, the Boeing Classic has been held at The Club at Snoqualmie Ridge, a private course designed by Jack Nicklaus which opened for play  in 1999 as TPC Snoqualmie Ridge.

From 2007 to 2010, the tournament was played the week following the JELD-WEN Tradition, a senior major championship played in Sunriver, Oregon. For its first two years, the tournament immediately preceded The Tradition, which was then played at The Reserve near Portland.  The Tradition moved to Alabama in 2011 and is played in May.

The purse for the 2007 tournament was $1.6 million, with $240,000 to the champion, Denis Watson, the winner of a playoff. The seven-man, sudden death playoff was the largest in tour history, with the seven finishing the 54 holes at 207 (−9). The tournament concluded when Watson sunk an eagle putt on the second playoff hole, a second replay of the par-5 18th hole.

The purse for 2008 was $1.7 million, with a winner's share of $255,000. Tom Kite shot a final round 66 to finish at 202 (−14), two strokes ahead of second round leader Scott Simpson . Kite was the only player in the field to break 70 in all three rounds and became the first repeat winner of the event. Kite won the tournament in 2006 in a one-hole playoff over Keith Fergus, and was the runner-up in 2005, finishing three strokes behind David Eger.

The 2009 tournament was held on August 28–30 with a $1.8 million purse. Second-round co-leader Loren Roberts birdied the final two holes and outlasted Mark O'Meara by nearly matching his sterling tee shot at 17 and dribbled in a  birdie putt. Roberts shot a 7-under 65 in the final round and set a new tournament record 

In 2010, the U.S. Senior Open was held at Sahalee Country Club in nearby Sammamish, and won by Bernhard Langer with a final score of 272 (−8). The Boeing Classic was held four weeks after on August 27–29, also won by Langer by three strokes over Nick Price of Zimbabwe. Langer tied the record set the previous year by Roberts 

The purse was raised to an even $2 million in 2011, with a winner's share of $300,000. Half of the first twelve editions ended in playoffs.

Course layout

Winners

Multiple winners
Two players have won this tournament more than once through 2017.

2 wins: Tom Kite (2006, 2008) and Bernhard Langer (2010, 2016)

Video
YouTube − video highlights − 2006−2011

References

External links

Coverage on the PGA Tour Champions' official site
The Club at Snoqualmie Ridge – official site
Nicklaus.com – The Club at Snoqualmie Ridge

PGA Tour Champions events
Golf in Washington (state)
Annual sporting events in the United States
Recurring sporting events established in 2005